The ponmudi dam is a concrete gravity dam built across the Panniyar river which is a tributary of Periyar River at Konnathadi panchayath of Konnathadi village in Idukki district of Kerala, India. The dam was constructed in 1963 as a part of a hydroelectric project. The hydropower component of the dam has an installed capacity of 30 MW with firm power of 17 MW, generating 158 GWh annually. Taluks through which the river flow are Udumpanchola, Devikulam, Kothamangalam, Muvattupuzha, Kunnathunadu, Aluva, Kodungalloor and Paravur.

Location
The dam, located near Munnar on the Panniar River in the Periyar River valley in Kerala, is part of the basin of the  West flowing rivers of the Tadri to Kanyakumari. The nearest city is Udumbanchola.

Features
The dam is located in Seismic Zone-III. The flood discharge is routed through a spillway which is fitted with three radial gates, each .

Hydro power development

The power station located at Panniyar is provided with installation of 30 MW comprising two units, each of 15 MW capacity Francis turbines. The firm power generation is 17 MW and the annual power generated is 158 GWh. The first unit was commissioned on 29 December 1963 and the second unit on 26 January 1964. The units were renovated in 2001 and 2003.

Major disaster
In a major disaster at the project site, which occurred 17 September 2007, one of the penstock valves burst causing the death of 7 people, destroying 15 houses, and damaging  of crops. The reason attributed to the pipe burst is the loosening of the flange bolt connection. The damaged valve was rectified in July 2009.

References

External links

Dams in Idukki district
Dams completed in 1963
1963 establishments in Kerala
20th-century architecture in India